Passalora fulva is a fungal plant pathogen that causes tomato leaf mold.

References

External links 
 USDA ARS Fungal Database

Fungal plant pathogens and diseases
Tomato diseases
Mycosphaerellaceae
Fungi described in 2003